William Kite ( – after 1845) was a 19th-century circus performer, best known as being the "Mr. Kite" from the Beatles 1967 song "Being for the Benefit of Mr. Kite!"

Biography
Kite came from a circus family. He was born in Lambeth, London, about 1825.  His father, James Kite, was a circus proprietor, and the first to visit Knott Mill Fair, Manchester, in 1806.  James Kite formed his own company around 1810, travelling as "Kite's Pavilion Circus."

William Kite was a performer at Wells's Circus from 1842 to 1843 and in Pablo Fanque's circus in Rochdale from 1843 to 1845. A "Miss Kite", possibly a sister, also performed in Fanque's circus, in Burnley, in 1845. His daughter, Elizabeth Ann Kite, later performed in the circus as an "Equestrienne". She married Eugene Gaertner, a member of another circus family.

"Being for the Benefit of Mr. Kite!" song
A broadside poster advertising Pablo Fanque's Circus Royal show in Rochdale, dated 14 February 1843, inspired, and provided many of the lyrics for, the Beatles' song, "Being for the Benefit of Mr. Kite!" from their 1967 album Sgt. Pepper's Lonely Hearts Club Band. The poster also notes that Mr. Kite was then "late of Wells's Circus." Kite was a riding master for Pablo Fanque at this time and, as documented by the poster, a tightrope walker as well. Kite was also an all-around performer with John Sanger's Circus.

In other media
A fictionalised version of Mr. Kite is portrayed as a ringmaster in a musical sequence from the 2007 film based on the music of the Beatles, Across the Universe. He is played by actor and comedian Eddie Izzard. In the 1978 film Sgt. Pepper's Lonely Hearts Club Band, a character named Mr. Kite is portrayed by George Burns as the mayor of a small town, but has no otherwise relationship to the real figure beyond the Beatles connection.

References

People from Lambeth
Circus owners
Year of birth uncertain
Year of death missing